The 1990 FIFA World Cup qualification UEFA Group 4 was a UEFA qualifying group for the 1990 FIFA World Cup. The group comprised Finland, European champions the Netherlands, Wales and West Germany.

The group was won by the Netherlands, who qualified for the 1990 FIFA World Cup. West Germany also qualified as one of the best runners-up.

Standings

Results

Goalscorers
There were 29 goals scored during the 12 games, an average of 2.42 goals per game.

4 goals

 Rudi Völler

2 goals

 Mika Lipponen
 John Bosman
 Lothar Matthäus
 Andreas Möller
 Karl-Heinz Riedle

1 goal

 Mixu Paatelainen
 Kari Ukkonen
 Ruud Gullit
 Wim Kieft
 Erwin Koeman
 Ronald Koeman
 Graeme Rutjes
 Marco van Basten
 Malcolm Allen
 Mark Bowen
 Dean Saunders
 Thomas Häßler
 Jürgen Klinsmann
 Pierre Littbarski

See also
 Germany–Netherlands football rivalry

4
1988–89 in German football
Qual
1988–89 in Welsh football
1989–90 in Welsh football
1988–89 in Dutch football
Qual
1989 in Finnish football
1990 in Finnish football